Carlos Stohr (September 29, 1931 – December 24, 2017) was a Czech-born Venezuelan painter. He did over 5,000 paintings and drawings, and he authored several books.

References

1931 births
2017 deaths
Artists from Prague
People from Caracas
Czechoslovak emigrants to Venezuela
Venezuelan painters